James Cope may refer to:

 Jim Cope (1907–1999), Australian politician
 James Cope (cricketer) (born 1966), English schoolteacher and cricketer
 James Cope (UK politician) (c. 1709–1756), British Member of Parliament and political envoy